In Euclidean geometry, the isodynamic points of a triangle are points associated with the triangle, with the properties that an inversion centered at one of these points transforms the given triangle into an equilateral triangle, and that the distances from the isodynamic point to the triangle vertices are inversely proportional to the opposite side lengths of the triangle. Triangles that are similar to each other have isodynamic points in corresponding locations in the plane, so the isodynamic points are triangle centers, and unlike other triangle centers the isodynamic points are also invariant under Möbius transformations. A triangle that is itself equilateral has a unique isodynamic point, at its centroid(as well as its orthocenter, its incenter, and its circumcenter, which are concurrent); every non-equilateral triangle has two isodynamic points.

Distance ratios
The isodynamic points were originally defined from certain equalities of ratios (or equivalently of products) of distances between pairs of points.

Hence, line  is the common radical axis for each of the three pairs of circles of Apollonius. The perpendicular bisector of line segment  is the Lemoine line, which contains the three centers of the circles of Apollonius.

Transformations
Inversion of the triangle  with respect to an isodynamic point transforms the original triangle into an equilateral triangle.
Inversion with respect to the circumcircle of triangle  leaves the triangle invariant but transforms one isodynamic point into the other one.

Angles

As well as being the intersections of the circles of Apollonius, each isodynamic point is the intersection points of another triple of circles. Similarly, the second isodynamic point is the intersection of three circles that intersect the circumcircle to form lenses with apex angle π/3.

Among all the equilateral triangles inscribed in triangle , the pedal triangle of the first isodynamic point is the one with minimum area.

Additional properties
The isodynamic points are the isogonal conjugates of the two Fermat points of triangle , and vice versa.

The Neuberg cubic contains both of the isodynamic points.

If a circle is partitioned into three arcs, the first isodynamic point of the arc endpoints is the unique point inside the circle with the property that each of the three arcs is equally likely to be the first arc reached by a Brownian motion starting at that point. That is, the isodynamic point is the point for which the harmonic measure of the three arcs is equal.

This construction generalizes isodynamic points to polynomials of degree  in the sense that the zeros of the above discriminant are invariant under Möbius transformations.

Here  is the expression that appears in the relaxed Newton’s method with relaxation parameter . A similar construction exists for rational functions instead of polynomials.

Construction

The line segment between these two intersection points is the diameter of the circle of Apollonius. The isodynamic points may be found by constructing two of these circles and finding their two intersection points.

The second isodynamic point may be constructed similarly but with the equilateral triangles erected outwards rather than inwards.

Alternatively, the position of the first isodynamic point may be calculated from its trilinear coordinates, which are

Notes

References

.
.
.
.
.
.
.
.
.
.
. The definition of isodynamic points is in a footnote on page 204.
. The discussion of isodynamic points is on pp. 138–139. Rigby calls them "Napoleon points", but that name more commonly refers to a different triangle center, the point of concurrence between the lines connecting the vertices of Napoleon's equilateral triangle with the opposite vertices of the given triangle.
. See especially p. 498.

External links

 Isodynamic points X(15) and X(16) in the Encyclopedia of Triangle Centers, by Clark Kimberling

Triangle centers